This is a list of rivers in Oceania.

Australia
List of rivers of Australia

Cook Islands
Avana River

Fiji

Ba River
Dreketi River
Navua River
Rewa River
Sigatoka River

French Polynesia
Papenoo River

New Zealand
List of rivers of New Zealand

Papua New Guinea
Asaro River
Bae'e River
Chimbu River
Eilanden River
Fly River
Gogol River
Jaba River
Kabenau River
Kikori River
Malas River
Mambare River
Markham River
Ok Tedi River
Pulau River
Purari River
Ramu River
Sepik River
Sogeram River
Strickland River
Torokina River
Turama River
Watut River
Warangoi River
Wawoi River

Samoa
List of rivers of Samoa

Western New Guinea
Digul
Mamberamo River
Tariku River
Taritatu River
Van Daalen River

See also
 Lists of rivers
 List of rivers of Europe
 List of rivers of Africa
 List of rivers of the Americas
 List of rivers of Asia

 
Oceania, List of rivers of
River